Joseph Cumming is a scholar of Islamic and Christian thought who serves as pastor of the International Church at Yale University and works internationally as a consultant on Muslim-Christian and Muslim-Christian-Jewish relations. He was one of the architects of the "Yale Response" to the Common Word initiative of 138 prominent Muslim leaders and scholars. He is also International Director of Doulos Community, a humanitarian organization working in the Islamic Republic of Mauritania, and is past president of the Federation of NGOs in Mauritania. Cumming has published numerous articles on issues affecting relations among the Abrahamic faith communities. He has lectured in Arabic at Al-Azhar University and other Islamic institutions and has taught courses at Yale Divinity School, as well as at Fuller Theological Seminary and other Evangelical institutions. He has been interviewed in Arabic on Al-Jazeera and other Arab television networks, and in English on American and Canadian television and radio, and in French and German by European and African news media.

References

External links

Living people
Princeton University alumni
Fuller Theological Seminary alumni
Yale University alumni
Horace Mann School alumni
Religious leaders from New York City
Religious studies scholars
Religious philosophers
American Assemblies of God pastors
Year of birth missing (living people)